In literature, symbolic language refers to the use of words, phrases, or characters to represent or reference concepts. Symbolic language may be used to communicate meaning or produce effects such as emotions or feelings that are not directly stated.

See also
Archetype
Linguistics
Natural language
Semiotics
Symbolic language (other)
Symbolism (arts)

References

External links

Symbols and Religious Language

Narrative techniques